L'uomo che guarda (The Man Who Looks), misleadingly translated into English as The Voyeur,  is a 1994 Italian erotic drama film written and directed by Tinto Brass in a free adaptation of Alberto Moravia's eponymous 1985 novel. It tells the story of an academic who in his interactions with other people is fated to watch and not to act, an approach that does not lead him to success with women.

Plot
In Rome, Dodo is a university lecturer taking a class in French literature. Also in the apartment is his bedridden father Alberto, whose nurse Fausta looks after his medical and sexual needs. The withdrawn Dodo does not respond to her provocative behaviour and is repelled by the rampant sexuality of his father. Part of his trouble is that he was too close to his now dead mother, who not only had to meet her husband's needs but also had to share him with countless other women. But his main problem is that his beautiful and sexy wife Silvia, who breezed into his quiet studious life, has vanished with another man.

After a class, an African girl called Pascasie asks him back to her flat and strips off, inviting him to photograph her. When her flatmate comes home, after an initial spat over the presence of a strange man, the two girls start making love. Dodo, always the observer and not the participant, leaves them to it. Increasingly, he fantasises about the absent Silvia and about the sex lives of his parents. One night there is a mystery woman in his father's bedroom and in the morning Fausta says it must have been Silvia, because she still has a door key. Then, all of a sudden, Silvia says she wants to come back to the apartment.

Cast 
 Katarina Vasilissa ... Silvia
 Francesco Casale ... Dodo
 Cristina Garavaglia ... Fausta
 Raffaella Offidani ... Pascasie
 Antonio Salines ... Medical attendant
 Martine Brochard ... The contessa
 Franco Branciaroli ... Alberto
 Ted Rusoff ... The Parking Attendant
 Tinto Brass (uncredited)

References

External links
 

1994 films
Italian erotic drama films
1990s Italian-language films
1990s psychological drama films
1990s erotic drama films
Films directed by Tinto Brass
Adultery in films
Films scored by Riz Ortolani
Films based on works by Alberto Moravia
Films set in Rome
Italian psychological drama films
1994 drama films
1990s Italian films